The following is a list of notable film director and cinematographer collaborations. It is ordered by film director.

Films for which the cinematographer won the Academy Award are in bold.

A
J. J. Abrams
Dan Mindel
 Mission: Impossible III (2006)
 Star Trek (2009)
 Star Trek Into Darkness (2013)
 Star Wars: The Force Awakens (2015)
 Star Wars: The Rise of Skywalker (2019)

Robert Aldrich
Joseph Biroc
 World for Ransom (1954)
 Attack (1956)
 The Garment Jungle (1957)
 Hush...Hush, Sweet Charlotte (1964, Academy Award nomination)
 The Flight of the Phoenix (1965)
 The Legend of Lylah Clare (1968)
 The Killing of Sister George (1968)
 The Greatest Mother of Them All (1969)
 Too Late the Hero (1970)
 The Grissom Gang (1971)
 Ulzana's Raid (1972)
 Emperor of the North Pole (1973)
 The Longest Yard (1974)
 Hustle (1975)
 The Choirboys (1977)
 ...All the Marbles (1981)

Woody Allen

Carlo Di Palma
 Hannah and Her Sisters (1986)
 Radio Days (1987)
 September (1987)
 Alice (1990)
 Shadows and Fog (1992)
 Husbands and Wives (1992)
 Manhattan Murder Mystery (1993)
 Bullets Over Broadway (1994)
 Don't Drink the Water (1994) — made for TV
 Mighty Aphrodite (1995)
 Everyone Says I Love You (1996)
 Deconstructing Harry (1997)
Darius Khondji
 Anything Else (2003)
 Midnight in Paris (2011) 
 To Rome With Love (2012) 
 Magic in the Moonlight (2014)
 Irrational Man (2015) 
Gordon Willis
 Annie Hall (1977)
 Interiors (1978)
 Manhattan (1979)
 Stardust Memories (1980)
 A Midsummer Night's Sex Comedy (1982)
 Zelig (1983, Academy Award nomination)
 Broadway Danny Rose (1984)
 The Purple Rose of Cairo (1985)

Pedro Almodóvar
José Luis Alcaine
 Mujeres al borde de un ataque de nervios (Women on the Verge of a Nervous Breakdown) (1988)
 ¡Átame! (Tie Me Up! Tie Me Down!) (1990)
 La Mala Educación (Bad Education) (2004)
 Volver (2006)
 La piel que habito (The Skin I Live In) (2011)
 Los amantes pasajeros (I'm So Excited) (2013)
 Dolor y gloria (Pain and Glory) (2019)
 Madres paralelas (Parallel Mothers) (2021)

Robert Altman

Pierre Mignot
 Come Back to the 5 & Dime, Jimmy Dean, Jimmy Dean (1982)
 Streamers (1983)
 Secret Honor (1984)
 O.C. and Stiggs (1984, released in 1987)
 Fool for Love (1985)
 Beyond Therapy (1987)
 Prêt-à-Porter (1994), with Jean Lépine
Vilmos Zsigmond
 McCabe & Mrs. Miller (1971)
 Images (1972)
 The Long Goodbye (1973)

Wes Anderson
Robert Yeoman
 Bottle Rocket (1996)
 Rushmore (1998)
 The Royal Tenenbaums (2001)
 Life Aquatic with Steve Zissou (2004)
 The Darjeeling Limited (2007)
 Moonrise Kingdom (2012)
 The Grand Budapest Hotel (2014, Academy Award nomination)
 The French Dispatch (2021)
 Asteroid City (2022)

B
Warren Beatty
 Vittorio Storaro
 Reds (1981, Academy Award)
 Dick Tracy (1990)
 Bulworth (1998)

Ingmar Bergman

Gunnar Fischer
 Port of Call (1948)
 Thirst (1949)
 This Can't Happen Here (1950)
 To Joy (1950)
 Summer Interlude (1951)
 Secrets of Women (1952)
 Summer with Monika (1953)
 Smiles of a Summer Night (1955)
 The Seventh Seal (1957)
 Wild Strawberries (1957)
 The Magician (1958)
 The Devil's Eye (1960)
Sven Nykvist
 Sawdust and Tinsel (1953) – also with Hilding Bladh
 The Virgin Spring (1960)
 Through a Glass Darkly (1961)
 The Silence (1963)
 Winter Light (1963)
 All These Women (1964)
 Persona (1966)
 Shame (1968)
 Hour of the Wolf (1968)
 The Rite (1969) – made for TV
 The Passion of Anna (1969)
 The Touch (1971)
 Cries and Whispers (1973, Academy Award)
 Scenes from a Marriage (1973)
 The Magic Flute (1975)
 Face to Face (1976)
 The Serpent's Egg (1977)
 Autumn Sonata (1978)
 From the Life of the Marionettes (1980)
 Fanny and Alexander (1982, Academy Award)
 After the Rehearsal (1984) – made for TV

Bruce Beresford

Peter James
 Driving Miss Daisy (1989)
 Mister Johnson (1990)
 Black Robe (1991)
 Rich in Love (1992)
 Silent Fall (1994)
 Last Dance (1996)
 Paradise Road (1997)
 Double Jeopardy (1999)
 Bride of the Wind (2001)
 And Starring Pancho Villa as Himself (2003, miniseries)
 Mao's Last Dancer (2009)
 Ladies in Black (2018)
Donald McAlpine
 The Adventures of Barry McKenzie (1972)
 Barry McKenzie Holds His Own (1974)
 Don's Party (1976)
 The Getting of Wisdom (1977)
 Money Movers (1978)
 Breaker Morant (1980)
 The Club (1980)
 Puberty Blues (1981)
 King David (1985)
 The Fringe Dwellers (1986)

Bernardo Bertolucci
Vittorio Storaro
 La strategia del ragno (1970)
 Il conformista (1970)
 Last Tango in Paris (1973)
 1900 (1976)
 La Luna (1979)
 The Last Emperor (1987, Academy Award)
 The Sheltering Sky (1990)
 Little Buddha (1993)

Kenneth Branagh
Haris Zambarloukos
 Sleuth (2007)
 Thor (2011)
 Jack Ryan: Shadow Recruit (2014)
 Cinderella (2015)
 Murder on the Orient Express (2017)
 Artemis Fowl (2020)
 Belfast (2021)
 Death on the Nile (2022)

C

Frank Capra
Joseph Walker
 Flight (1929), with Elmer Dyer and Paul Perry
 Ladies of Leisure (1930)
 Rain or Shine (1930)
 Dirigible (1931)
 The Miracle Woman (1931)
 Platinum Blonde (1931)
 Forbidden (1932)
 American Madness (1932)
 The Bitter Tea of General Yen (1933)
 Lady for a Day (1933)
 It Happened One Night (1934)
 Broadway Bill (1934)
 Mr. Deeds Goes to Town (1936)
 Lost Horizon (1937), with Elmer Dyer
 You Can't Take It with You (1938, Academy Award nomination)
 Mr. Smith Goes to Washington (1939)
 It's a Wonderful Life (1946), with Joseph Biroc and Victor Milner

John Carpenter
Gary B. Kibbe
 Prince of Darkness (1987)
 They Live (1988)
 Body Bags (1993) (made-for-TV) (segments: "The Gas Station" and "Hair")
 In the Mouth of Madness (1994)
 Village of the Damned (1995)
 Escape from L.A. (1996)
 Vampires (1998)
 Ghosts of Mars (2001)

Claude Chabrol

Jean Rabier
 Le Beau Serge (Handsome Serge / Bitter Reunion) (1958) — also with Henri Decaë
 Les Godelureaux (Wise Guys) (1961)
 Les Sept Péchés capitaux (The Seven Deadly Sins) (segment "L'Avarice") (1962)
 L'Œil du Malin (The Eye of Evil) (1962)
 Landru (Bluebeard) (1963)
 Ophélia (1963)
 Les Plus Belles Escroqueries du monde (The World's Most Beautiful Swindlers) (segment "L'Homme qui vendit la tour Eiffel") (1964)
 Le Tigre aime la chair fraîche (Code Name: Tiger / The Tiger Likes Fresh Meat) (1964)
 Paris vu par... (Six in Paris) (segment "La Muette") (1965)
 Marie-Chantal contre le docteur Kha (Marie-Chantal vs. Doctor Kha) (1965)
 Le Tigre se parfume à la dynamite (An Orchid for the Tiger / Our Agent Tiger) (1965)
 La Ligne de démarcation (Line of Demarcation) (1966)
 Le Scandale (The Champagne Murders) (1967)
 La Route de Corinthe (The Road to Corinth) (1967)
 Les Biches (The Does / Bad Girls / Girlfriends) (1968)
 La Femme infidèle (The Unfaithful Wife) (1969)
 Que la bête meure (This Man Must Die) (1969)
 Le Boucher (The Butcher) (1970)
 La Rupture (The Breach / Hallucination / The Breakup) (1970)
 Juste avant la nuit (Just Before Nightfall) (1971)
 La Décade prodigieuse (Ten Days' Wonder) (1971)
 Docteur Popaul (Scroundel in White / High Heels / Play Now, Play Later) (1972)
 Les Noces rouges (Wedding in Blood) (1973)
 Nada (The Nada Gang) (1974)
 Une partie de plaisir (A Piece of Pleasure / Pleasure Party) (1975)
 Les Innocents aux mains sales (Dirty Hands / Innocents with Dirty Hands) (1975)
 Les Magiciens (Death Rite) (1976)
 Folies bourgeoises (The Twist) (1976)
 Alice ou la dernière fugue (Alice / Alice or The Last Escapade) (1977)
 Les Liens de sang (Blood Relatives) (1978)
 Violette Nozière (Violette) (1978)
 Le Cheval d'orgueil (The Proud Ones / The Horse of Pride) (1980)
 Les Fantômes du chapelier (The Hatter's Ghost) (1982)
 Poulet au vinaigre (Chicken with Vinegar) (1985)
 Inspecteur Lavardin (1986)
 Masques (Masks) (1987)
 Le Cri du hibou (The Cry of the Owl) (1987)
 Une affaire de femmes (Story of Women) (1988)
 Jours tranquilles à Clichy (Quiet Days in Clichy) (1990)
 Dr. M (1990)
 Madame Bovary (1991)
Eduardo Serra
 Rien ne va plus (The Swindle) (1997)
 Au cœur du mensonge (The Color of Lies) (1999)
 La Fleur du Mal (The Flower of Evil) (2003)
 La Demoiselle d'honneur (The Bridesmaid) (2004)
 L'Ivresse du pouvoir (A Comedy of Power) (2006)
 La Fille coupée en deux (A Girl Cut in Two) (2007)
 Bellamy (2009)

Charlie Chaplin
 Roland Totheroh
 The Floorwalker (1916 short) (with William C. Foster)
 The Fireman (1916 short) (with William C. Foster)
 The Vagabond (1916 short) (with William C. Foster)
 One A.M. (1916 short) (with William C. Foster)
 The Count (1916 short) (with George C. Zalibra)
 The Pawnshop (1916 short) (with William C. Foster)
 Behind the Screen (1916 short) (with George C. Zalibra)
 The Rink (1916 short) (with George C. Zalibra)
 Easy Street (1917 short) (with George C. Zalibra)
 The Cure (1917 short) (with George C. Zalibra)
 The Immigrant (1917 short) (with George C. Zalibra)
 The Adventurer (1917 short) (with George C. Zalibra)
 A Dog's Life (1918 short)
 Shoulder Arms (1918 short)
 Sunnyside (1919 short)
 The Professor (1919 unfinished short)
 A Day's Pleasure (1919 short)
 The Kid (1921)
 The Idle Class (1921 short)
 Pay Day (1922 short)
 A Woman of Paris (1923) (with Jack Wilson)
 The Gold Rush (1925)
 The Circus (1928) 
 City Lights (1931) (with Gordon Pollock)
 Modern Times (1936) (with Ira H. Morgan)
 The Great Dictator (1940) (with Karl Struss)
 Monsieur Verdoux (1947) (with an uncredited Curt Courant)
 Limelight (1952) (credited to Karl Struss; "photographic consultant" only)

Coen brothers

Roger Deakins
 Barton Fink (1991)
 The Hudsucker Proxy (1994)
 Fargo (1996, Academy Award nomination)
 The Big Lebowski (1998)
 O Brother, Where Art Thou? (2000, Academy Award nomination)
 The Man Who Wasn't There (2001, Academy Award nomination)
 Intolerable Cruelty (2003)
 The Ladykillers (2004)
 No Country for Old Men (2007, Academy Award nomination)
 A Serious Man (2009)
 True Grit (2010, Academy Award nomination)
 Hail, Caesar! (2016)
Bruno Delbonnel
 Paris, je t'aime (segment "Tuileries") (2006) 
 Inside Llewyn Davis (2013, Academy Award nomination)
 The Ballad of Buster Scruggs (2018, miniseries)
The Tragedy of Macbeth (2021, Academy Award nomination)
Barry Sonnenfeld
 Blood Simple (1984)
 Raising Arizona (1987)
 Miller's Crossing (1990)

Francis Ford Coppola

Vittorio Storaro
 Apocalypse Now (1979, Academy Award)
 One from the Heart (1982)
 Tucker: The Man and His Dream (1988)
 New York Stories (segment "Life Without Zoë") (1989)
Gordon Willis
 The Godfather (1972)
 The Godfather Part II (1974)
 The Godfather Part III (1990, Academy Award nomination)

David Cronenberg

Mark Irwin
 Fast Company (1979)
 The Brood (1979)
 Scanners (1981)
 Videodrome (1983)
 The Dead Zone (1983)
 The Fly (1986)
Peter Suschitzky
 Dead Ringers (1988)
 Naked Lunch (1990)
 M. Butterfly (1993)
 Crash (1996)
 eXistenZ (1999)
 Spider (2002)
 A History of Violence (2005)
 Eastern Promises (2007)
 A Dangerous Method (2011)
 Cosmopolis (2012)
 Maps to the Stars (2014)

Alfonso Cuarón
Emmanuel Lubezki
 Sólo con tu pareja (1991)
 A Little Princess (1995, Academy Award nomination)
 Great Expectations (1998)
 Y tu mamá también (2001)
 Children of Men (2006, Academy Award nomination)
 Gravity (2013, Academy Award) – with Michael Seresin

D
Joe Dante
John Hora
 The Howling (1981)
 Twilight Zone: The Movie (segment "It's a Good Life") (1983)
 Gremlins (1984)
 Explorers (1985)
 Gremlins 2: The New Batch (1990)
 Matinee (1993)

Dardenne brothers
Alain Marcoen
 La Promesse (The Promise) (1996)
 Rosetta (1999)
 Le Fils (The Son) (2002)
 L'Enfant (The Child) (2005)
 Chacun son cinéma (To Each His Own Cinema) (segment "Dans l'obscurité") (2007)
 Le Silence de Lorna (Lorna's Silence) (2008)
 Le Gamin au vélo (The Kid with a Bike) (2011)
 Two Days, One Night (2014)

Guillermo del Toro

Guillermo Navarro
 Cronos (1993)
 The Devil's Backbone (2001)
 Hellboy (2004)
 Pan's Labyrinth (2006)
 Hellboy II: The Golden Army (2008)
 Pacific Rim (2013)
Dan Laustsen
 Mimic (1997)
 Crimson Peak (2015)
 The Shape of Water (2017, Academy Award nomination)
 Nightmare Alley (2021, Academy Award nomination)

Claire Denis
Agnès Godard
 Jacques Rivette, le veilleur (Jacques Rivette, the Watchman) (1990), made for TV
 J'ai pas sommeil (I Can't Sleep) (1994)
 US Go Home (1994)
 Nénette et Boni (Nenette and Boni) (1996)
 Beau travail (Good Work) (1999)
 Trouble Every Day (2001)
 Ten Minutes Older: The Cello (segment "Vers Nancy") (2002)
 Vendredi soir (Friday Night) (2002)
 L'Intrus (The Intruder) (2004)
 35 rhums (35 Shots of Rum) (2008)

E
Clint Eastwood

Jack N. Green
 Heartbreak Ridge (1986)
 Bird (1988)
 White Hunter Black Heart (1990)
 The Rookie (1990)
 Unforgiven (1992, Academy Award nomination)
 A Perfect World (1993)
 The Bridges of Madison County (1995)
 Absolute Power (1997)
 Midnight in the Garden of Good and Evil (1997)
 True Crime (1999)
 Space Cowboys (2000)
Tom Stern
 Blood Work (2002)
 Mystic River (2003)
 Million Dollar Baby (2004)
 Flags of Our Fathers (2006)
 Letters from Iwo Jima (2006)
 Changeling (2008, Academy Award nomination)
 Gran Torino (2008)
 Invictus (2009)
 Hereafter (2010)
 J. Edgar (2011)
 Jersey Boys (2014)
 American Sniper (2014)
 Sully (2016)
 The 15:17 to Paris (2018)
Bruce Surtees
 Play Misty for Me (1971)
 High Plains Drifter (1973)
 The Outlaw Josey Wales (1976)
 Firefox (1982)
 Honkytonk Man (1982)
 Sudden Impact (1983)
 Pale Rider (1985)

Blake Edwards

Dick Bush
 Victor/Victoria (1982)
 Trail of the Pink Panther (1982)
 Curse of the Pink Panther (1983)
 Switch (1991)
 Son of the Pink Panther (1993)
Philip H. Lathrop
The Perfect Furlough (1958)
 Experiment in Terror (1962)
 Days of Wine and Roses (1962)
 The Pink Panther (1963)
 What Did You Do in the War, Daddy? (1966)
 Gunn (1967)
 Wild Rovers (1971)
Harry Stradling Jr.
 S.O.B. (1981)
 Micki & Maude (1984)
 A Fine Mess (1986)
 Blind Date (1987)

Robert Eggers

Jarin Blaschke
 The Witch (2015)
 The Lighthouse (2019)
 The Northman (2022)
 Nosferatu (TBA)

Atom Egoyan

Paul Sarossy
 Speaking Parts (1989)
 Montreal Stories (segment "In Passing") (1991)
 The Adjuster (1991)
 Exotica (1994)
 The Sweet Hereafter (1997)
 Felicia's Journey (1999)
 The Line (2000)
 Ararat (2002)
 Where the Truth Lies (2005)
 Adoration (2008)
 Chloe (2009)
 Devil's Knot (2013)
 Remember (2015)

Sergei Eisenstein
Eduard Tisse
 Strike (1925)
 The Battleship Potemkin (1925)
 October: Ten Days That Shook the World (1928)
 The Storming of La Sarraz (1929)
 The General Line (1929)
 Romance sentimentale (1930)
 ¡Que viva México! (1931, released in 1979)
 Bezhin Meadow (1937)
 Alexander Nevsky (1938)
 Ivan the Terrible, Part I (1944)
 Ivan the Terrible, Part II (1946)
 Ivan the Terrible, Part III (1948, unfinished)

F
Rainer Werner Fassbinder

 Michael Ballhaus
 Whity (1971)
 Beware of a Holy Whore (1971)
 The Bitter Tears of Petra von Kant (1972)
 World on a Wire (1973)
 Martha (1974)
 Fox and His Friends (1975)
 Mother Küsters' Trip to Heaven (1975)
 Satan's Brew (1976)
 Chinese Roulette (1976)
 I Only Want You To Love Me (1976)
 Germany in Autumn (1978)
 Despair (1978)
 The Marriage of Maria Braun (1979)
 Lili Marleen (1981)
 Dietrich Lohmann
 Love Is Colder Than Death (1969)
 Katzelmacher (1969)
 Gods of the Plague (1970)
 Why Does Herr R. Run Amok? (1970)
 The American Soldier (1970)
 Rio das Mortes (1971)
 The Merchant of Four Seasons (1971)
 Eight Hours Don't Make a Day (1972)
 Ali: Fear Eats the Soul (1974)
 Effi Briest (1974)
 Xaver Schwarzenberger
 Lili Marleen (1981)
 Lola (1981)
 Veronika Voss (1982)
 Querelle (1982)

Federico Fellini

 Otello Martelli
 Variety Lights (1950)
 I Vitelloni (1953)
 La Strada (1954)
 Il bidone (1955)
 Nights of Cabiria (1957)
 La Dolce Vita (1960)
 Boccaccio '70 (segment "Le tentazioni del dottor Antonio") (1962)
 Giuseppe Rotunno
 Spirits of the Dead (segment "Toby Dammit") (1968)
 Fellini Satyricon (1969)
 Roma (1972)
 Amarcord (1973)
 Fellini's Casanova (1976)
 Orchestra Rehearsal (1978)
 City of Women (1980)
 And the Ship Sails On (1983)

Richard Fleischer

Jack Cardiff
 The Vikings (1958)
 The Prince and the Pauper (1977) 
 Conan the Destroyer (1984)
 Million Dollar Mystery (1987)
Richard H. Kline
 The Boston Strangler (1968)
 Soylent Green (1973)
 The Don Is Dead (1973)
 Mr. Majestyk (1974)
 Mandingo (1975)

John Ford

William H. Clothier
 The Horse Soldiers (1959)
 The Alamo (1960, Academy Award nomination)
 The Man Who Shot Liberty Valance (1962)
 Donovan's Reef (1963)
 Cheyenne Autumn (1964, Academy Award nomination)
Arthur Miller
Wee Willie Winkie (1937)
Submarine Patrol (1938)
Tobacco Road (1941)
How Green Was My Valley (1941, Academy Award)
Winton C. Hoch
3 Godfathers (1948)
She Wore a Yellow Ribbon (1949, Academy Award)
The Quiet Man (1952, Academy Award)
Mister Roberts (1955)
The Searchers (1956)

Miloš Forman
Miroslav Ondříček
 Loves of a Blonde (1965)
 The Firemen's Ball (1967)
 Taking Off (1971)
 Hair (1979)
 Ragtime (1981, Academy Award nomination)
 Amadeus (1984, Academy Award nomination)
 Valmont (1989)

Marc Forster
Roberto Schaefer
 Loungers (1995)
 Everything Put Together (2000)
 Monster's Ball (2001)
 Finding Neverland (2003)
 Stay (2005)
 Stranger Than Fiction (2006)
 Kite Runner (2007)
 Quantum of Solace (2008)
 Machine Gun Preacher (2011)

Stephen Frears
Oliver Stapleton
 My Beautiful Laundrette (1985)
 Prick Up Your Ears (1987)
 Sammy and Rosie Get Laid (1987)
 The Grifters (1990)
 Hero (1992)
 The Snapper (1993, TV movie)
 The Van (1996)
 The Hi-Lo Country (1998)

G
Jean-Luc Godard
Raoul Coutard
 Breathless (1960)
 The Little Soldier (1960)
 A Woman Is a Woman (1961)
 My Life to Live (1962)
 The Carabineers (1963)
 Contempt (1963)
 Bande à part (1964)
 A Married Woman (1964)
 Alphaville (1965)
 Pierrot le Fou (1965)
 Made in U.S.A. (1966)
 Two or Three Things I Know About Her (1967)
 La Chinoise (1967)
 Weekend (1967)
 Passion (1982)
 First Name: Carmen (1983) – with Jean-Bernard Menoud

D. W. Griffith
Billy Bitzer (incomplete)
The Birth of a Nation (1915)
Intolerance (1916)
Broken Blossoms (1919)
Way Down East (1920)

H
Lasse Hallström

Oliver Stapleton
 The Cider House Rules (1999)
 The Shipping News (2001)
 Casanova (2005)
 An Unfinished Life (2005)
 The Hoax (2006)
Sven Nykvist
 What's Eating Gilbert Grape (1993)
 Something to Talk About (1995)

Michael Haneke
Christian Berger
 Benny's Video (1992)
 71 Fragments of a Chronology of Chance (1994)
 The Piano Teacher (2001)
 Caché (2005)
 The White Ribbon (2009)
 Happy End (2017)

Henry Hathaway

Lucien Ballard
 Diplomatic Courier (1952)
 O. Henry's Full House (segment "The Clarion Call") (1952) with Milton Krasner
 Prince Valiant (1954)
 The Sons of Katie Elder (1965)
 Nevada Smith (1966)
 True Grit (1969)
Leon Shamroy
 Ten Gentlemen from West Point (1942, Academy Award nomination)
 White Witch Doctor (1953)
 North to Alaska (1960)
Charles Lang
 The Lives of a Bengal Lancer (1935)
 Peter Ibbetson (1935)
 Souls at Sea (1937)
 Spawn of the North (1938)
 The Shepherd of the Hills (1941)
 Sundown (1941, Academy Award nomination)
 How the West Was Won (segments "The Rivers" and "The Plains") (1962, Academy Award nomination)

Werner Herzog

Thomas Mauch
 Signs of Life (1968)
 Even Dwarfs Started Small (1970)
 The Flying Doctors of East Africa (1970)
 Aguirre, the Wrath of God (1972)
 How Much Wood Would a Woodchuck Chuck (1976)
 Stroszek (1977)
 Fitzcarraldo (1982)
 God's Angry Man (1981)
 Huie's Sermon (1981)
Jörg Schmidt-Reitwein
 Fata Morgana (1972)
 The Enigma of Kaspar Hauser (1974)
 Heart of Glass (1976)
 Nosferatu the Vampyre (1979)
 Woyzeck (1979)
 Where the Green Ants Dream (1984)
 Wodaabe – Herdsmen of the Sun (1989)
Peter Zeitlinger
 Gesualdo: Death for Five Voices (1995)
 Little Dieter Needs to Fly (1997)
 My Best Fiend (1999)
 Wings of Hope (2000)
 Invincible (2001)
 Wheel of Time (2003)
 Grizzly Man (2005)
 Rescue Dawn (2006)
 Encounters at the End of the World (2007)
 The Bad Lieutenant: Port of Call New Orleans (2009)
 My Son, My Son, What Have Ye Done? (2009)
 Cave of Forgotten Dreams (2010)
 Into the Abyss (2011)
 From One Second to the Next (2013)
 Queen of the Desert (2015)

Alfred Hitchcock
Robert Burks
 Strangers on a Train (1951, Academy Award nomination)
 I Confess (1952)
 Dial M for Murder (1954)
 Rear Window (1954, Academy Award nomination)
 To Catch a Thief (1955, Academy Award)
 The Trouble with Harry (1955)
 The Man Who Knew Too Much (1956)
 The Wrong Man (1956)
 Vertigo (1958)
 North by Northwest (1959)
 The Birds (1963)
 Marnie (1964)

Ron Howard
Salvatore Totino
 The Missing (2003)
 Cinderella Man (2005)
 The Da Vinci Code (2006)
 Frost/Nixon (2008)
 Angels & Demons (2009)
 The Dilemma (2011)
 Inferno (2016)

John Huston
Oswald Morris
 Moulin Rouge (1952)
 Beat the Devil (1953)
 Moby Dick (1956)
 Heaven Knows, Mr. Allison (1957)
 The Roots of Heaven (1958)
 The Mackintosh Man (1973)
 The Man Who Would Be King (1975)

J
Peter Jackson
Andrew Lesnie
 The Lord of the Rings: The Fellowship of the Ring (2001, Academy Award)
 The Lord of the Rings: The Two Towers (2002)
 The Lord of the Rings: The Return of the King (2003)
 King Kong (2005)
 The Lovely Bones (2009)
 The Hobbit: An Unexpected Journey (2012)
 The Hobbit: The Desolation of Smaug (2013)
 The Hobbit: The Battle of the Five Armies (2014)

Rian Johnson
Steve Yedlin
 Brick (2005)
 The Brothers Bloom (2008)
 Looper (2012)
 Star Wars: The Last Jedi (2017)
 Knives Out (2019)
 Glass Onion: A Knives Out Mystery (2022)

K
Lawrence Kasdan

Owen Roizman
 I Love You to Death (1990)
 Grand Canyon (1991)
 Wyatt Earp (1994)
 French Kiss (1995)
John Bailey
 The Big Chill (1983)
 Silverado (1985)
 The Accidental Tourist (1988)

Elia Kazan

Harry Stradling
 The Sea of Grass (1947)
 A Streetcar Named Desire (1951)
 A Face in the Crowd (1957) — with Gayne Rescher
Boris Kaufman
 On the Waterfront (1954, Academy Award)
 Baby Doll (1956, Academy Award nomination)
 Splendor in the Grass (1961)

Krzysztof Kieślowski
Sławomir Idziak
 The Scar (1976)
 Decalogue V (1988)
 A Short Film About Killing (1988)
 The Double Life of Véronique (1991)
 Three Colors: Blue (1993)

Henry King

Leon Shamroy
 Little Old New York (1940)
 A Yank in the R.A.F. (1941)
 The Black Swan (1942, Academy Award)
 Wilson (1944, Academy Award)
 Prince of Foxes (1949, Academy Award nomination)
 Twelve O'Clock High (1949)
 David and Bathsheba (1951, Academy Award nomination)
 Wait till the Sun Shines, Nellie (1952)
 The Snows of Kilimanjaro (1952, Academy Award nomination)
 King of the Khyber Rifles (1953)
 Love Is a Many-Splendored Thing (1955, Academy Award nomination)
 The Bravados (1958)
 Beloved Infidel (1959)
 Tender Is the Night (1962)
Arthur Miller
 The Song of Bernadette (1943, Academy Award)
 The Gunfighter (1950)
Joseph LaShelle
 A Bell for Adano (1945)
 Deep Waters (1948)

Stanley Kubrick
John Alcott
 2001: A Space Odyssey (some segments) (1968)
 A Clockwork Orange (1971)
 Barry Lyndon (1975, Academy Award)
 The Shining (1980)

Akira Kurosawa

Asakazu Nakai
 No Regrets for Our Youth (1946)
 One Wonderful Sunday (1947)
 Stray Dog (1949)
 Ikiru (1952)
 Seven Samurai (1954)
 I Live in Fear (1955)
 Throne of Blood (1957)
 High and Low (1963) – with Takao Saito
 Red Beard (1965)
 Dersu Uzala (1975) – with Yuri Gantman, Fyodor Dobronravov
 Kagemusha (1980) – with Takao Saito
 Ran (1985) – with Masaharu Ueda and Takao Saito
Takao Saito
 Sanjuro (1961)
 High and Low (1963) – with Asakazu Nakai
 Dodes'ka-den (1970) – with Yasumichi Fukuzawa
 Kagemusha (1980) --with Asakazu Nakai
 Ran (1985, Academy Award nomination) – with Masaharu Ueda, Asakazu Nakai
 Dreams (1990) – with Shôji Ueda
 Rhapsody in August (1991) – with Shôji Ueda
 Madadayo (1993) – with Shôji Ueda

L
Walter Lang

Leon Shamroy
Tin Pan Alley (1940)
Moon Over Miami (1941)
Greenwich Village (1944)
State Fair (1945)
Cheaper by the Dozen (1950)
On the Riviera (1951)
With a Song in My Heart (1952)
Call Me Madam (1953)
There's No Business Like Show Business (1954)
The King and I (1956, Academy Award nomination)
Desk Set (1957)
Snow White and the Three Stooges (1959)
Arthur Miller
The Little Princess (1939)
Susannah of the Mounties (1939)
The Blue Bird (1940, Academy Award nomination)

John Landis

Mac Ahlberg
 Oscar (1991)
 Black or White (1991) Michael Jackson music video
 Innocent Blood (1992)
 Beverly Hills Cop III (1994)
Robert Paynter
An American Werewolf in London (1981)
Trading Places (1983)
Thriller (1983) Michael Jackson music video
Into the Night (1985)
Spies Like Us (1985)
Stephen M. Katz
 The Kentucky Fried Movie (1977)
 The Blues Brothers (1980)
 Coming Soon (1982)

David Lean
Freddie Young
 Lawrence of Arabia (1962, Academy Award)
 Doctor Zhivago (1965, Academy Award)
 Ryan's Daughter (1970, Academy Award)

Spike Lee

Malik Hassan Sayeed
 Clockers (1995)
 Girl 6 (1996)
 He Got Game (1998)
 The Original Kings of Comedy (2000)
Ernest Dickerson
 She's Gotta Have It (1986)
 School Daze (1988)
 Do the Right Thing (1989)
 Mo' Better Blues (1990)
 Jungle Fever (1991)
 Malcolm X (1992)

Mike Leigh
Dick Pope
 Life Is Sweet (1990)
 Naked (1993)
 Secrets & Lies (1996)
 Career Girls (1997)
 Topsy-Turvy (1999)
 All or Nothing (2002)
 Vera Drake (2004)
 Happy-Go-Lucky (2008)
 Another Year (2010)
 Mr. Turner (2014)

Richard Lester
David Watkin
 The Knack ...and How to Get It (1965)
 Help! (1965)
 How I Won the War (1967)
 The Bed Sitting Room (1969)
 The Three Musketeers (1973)
 The Four Musketeers (1974)
 Robin and Marian (1976)
 Cuba (1979)

Richard Linklater

Lee Daniel
 Slacker (1991)
 Dazed and Confused (1993)
 Before Sunrise (1995)
 subUrbia (1996)
 Before Sunset (2004)
 Fast Food Nation (2006)
 Boyhood (2014) (With Shane Kelly)
Shane Kelly
 A Scanner Darkly (2006)
 Boyhood (2014) (With Lee Daniel)
 Everybody Wants Some!! (2016)
 Last Flag Flying (2017)
 Where'd You Go, Bernadette (2018)

Joseph Losey
Gerry Fisher
 Accident (1967)
 Secret Ceremony (1968)
 The Go-Between (1971)
 A Doll's House (1973)
 The Romantic Englishwoman (1975)
 Monsieur Klein (1976)
 Roads to the South (1978)
 Don Giovanni (1979)

David Lynch

Peter Deming
 Lost Highway (1997)
 Mulholland Drive (2001)
Freddie Francis
 The Elephant Man (1980)
 Dune (1984)
 The Straight Story (1999)

M
Joseph L. Mankiewicz
Milton Krasner
 House of Strangers (1949)
 No Way Out (1950)
 All About Eve (1950, Academy Award nomination)
 People Will Talk (1951)

Delbert Mann
Joseph LaShelle
 Marty (1955, Academy Award nomination)
 The Bachelor Party (1957)
 The Outsider (1961)

Michael Mann
Dante Spinotti
Manhunter (1986)
The Last of the Mohicans (1992)
Heat (1995)
The Insider (1999, Academy Award nomination)
Public Enemies (2009)
 
Jean-Pierre Melville
Henri Decaë
 Le Silence de la mer (1949)
 Les Enfants Terribles (1950)
 Bob le flambeur (1956)
 Léon Morin, Priest (1961)
 Magnet of Doom (1963)
 Le Samouraï (1967)
 Le Cercle Rouge (1970)

Vincente Minnelli

Milton Krasner
 Home from the Hill (1960)
 Bells Are Ringing (1960)
 The Four Horsemen of the Apocalypse (1962)
 The Courtship of Eddie's Father (1963)
 Goodbye Charlie (1964)
 The Sandpiper (1965)
Joseph Ruttenberg
 Brigadoon (1954)
 Kismet (1955)
 Gigi (1958, Academy Award)
 The Reluctant Debutante (1958)
John Alton
 Father of the Bride (1950)
 Father's Little Dividend (1951)
 An American in Paris (1952, Academy Award)
 Tea and Sympathy (1956)
 Designing Women (1957)

Kenji Mizoguchi

Minoru Miki
 The Water Magician (1933)
 Orizuru Osen (1935)
 Osaka Elegy (1936)
 Sisters of the Gion (1936)
 The Story of the Last Chrysanthemums (1939)
 Miyamoto Musashi (1944)
 Utamaro and His Five Women (1946)
 The Love of the Actress Sumako (1947)
Kazuo Miyagawa
 Miss Oyu (1951)
 A Geisha (1953)
 Ugetsu (1953)
 Sansho the Bailiff (1954)
 The Crucified Lovers (1954)
 The Woman in the Rumor (1954)
 Shin Heike Monogatari (1955)
 Street of Shame (1956)

N
Christopher Nolan

Wally Pfister
 Memento (2000)
 Insomnia (2002)
 Batman Begins (2005, Academy Award nomination)
 The Prestige (2006, Academy Award nomination)
 The Dark Knight (2008, Academy Award nomination)
 Inception (2010, Academy Award)
 The Dark Knight Rises (2012)
Hoyte van Hoytema
 Interstellar (2014)
 Dunkirk (2017, Academy Award nomination)
 Tenet (2020)
 Oppenheimer (2023)

O
Yasujirō Ozu

Hideo Mohara
 Walk Cheerfully (1930)
 I Flunked, But... (1930)
 That Night's Wife (1930)
 The Lady and the Beard (1931)
 Tokyo Chorus (1931)
 I Was Born, But... (1932)
 Where Now Are the Dreams of Youth (1932)
 Woman of Tokyo (1933)
 Dragnet Girl (1934)
 A Story of Floating Weeds (1934)
 An Inn in Tokyo (1935)
 What Did the Lady Forget (1937)
Yuhara Atsuta
 Brothers and Sisters of the Toda Family (1941)
 There Was a Father (1942)
 Record of a Tenant Gentleman (1947)
 A Hen in the Wind (1947)
 Late Spring (1949)
 Early Summer (1951)
 The Flavor of Green Tea over Rice (1952)
 Tokyo Story (1953)
 Early Spring (1956)
 Tokyo Twilight (1957)
 Equinox Flower (1958)
 Ohayo (1959)
 Late Autumn (1960)
 An Autumn Afternoon (1962)

P
Alan J. Pakula
Gordon Willis
 Klute (1971)
 The Parallax View (1974)
 All the President's Men (1976)
 Comes a Horseman (1978)
 Presumed Innocent (1990)
 The Devil's Own (1997)

Park Chan-wook
Chung Chung-hoon
 Oldboy (2003)
 Three... Extremes (segment "Cut") (2004)
 Sympathy for Lady Vengeance (2005)
 I'm a Cyborg, But That's OK (2006)
 Thirst (2009)
 Stoker (2013)
 The Handmaiden (2016)

Alan Parker
Michael Seresin
 Bugsy Malone (1976) — with Peter Biziou
 Midnight Express (1978)
 Fame (1980)
 Shoot the Moon (1982)
 Birdy (1984)
 Angel Heart (1987)
 Come See the Paradise (1990)
 Angela's Ashes (1999)
 The Life of David Gale (2003)

Pier Paolo Pasolini
Tonino Delli Colli
 Accattone (1961)
 Mamma Roma (1962)
 Ro.Go.Pa.G. (segment "La ricotta") (1963)
 The Gospel According to St. Matthew (1964)
 Love Meetings (1965)
 The Hawks and the Sparrows (1966) — with Mario Bernardo
 Caprice Italian Style (segment "Che cosa sono le nuvole?") (1968)
 Pigsty (1969) with Armando Nannuzzi and Giuseppe Ruzzolini
 The Decameron (1971)
 The Canterbury Tales (1972)
 Salò, or the 120 Days of Sodom (1975)

Sam Peckinpah
Lucien Ballard
 Ride the High Country (1962)
 Noon Wine (1966)
 The Wild Bunch (1969)
 The Ballad of Cable Hogue (1970)
 Junior Bonner (1972)
 The Getaway (1972)

Todd Phillips
Lawrence Sher
The Hangover (2009)
Due Date (2010)
The Hangover Part II (2011)
The Hangover Part III (2013)
War Dogs (2016)
Joker (2019, Academy Award nomination)

Roman Polanski
Paweł Edelman
 The Pianist (2002)
 Oliver Twist (2005)
 The Ghost Writer (2010)
 Carnage (2011)
 Venus in Fur (2013)
 Based on a True Story (2017)
 An Officer and a Spy (2019)
 The Palace (2023)

Sydney Pollack

Owen Roizman
 Three Days of the Condor (1975)
 The Electric Horseman (1979)
 Absence of Malice (1981)
 Tootsie (1982, Academy Award nomination)
 Havana (1990)

Powell and Pressburger

Erwin Hillier
 A Canterbury Tale (1944)
 I Know Where I'm Going! (1945)
Jack Cardiff
 A Matter of Life and Death (1946)
 Black Narcissus (1947, Academy Award)
 The Red Shoes (1948)
 Christopher Challis
 The Small Back Room (1949)
 Gone to Earth (1950)
 The Elusive Pimpernel (1950)
 The Tales of Hoffmann (1951)
 Oh... Rosalinda!! (1955)
 The Battle of the River Plate (1956)
 Ill Met by Moonlight (1957)
 The Boy Who Turned Yellow (1972)

R
Sam Raimi 
Peter Deming
 Evil Dead II (1987) 
 Drag Me to Hell (2009) 
 Oz the Great and Powerful (2013)

Mani Ratnam

P. C. Sreeram
 Mouna Ragam (1986)
 Nayakan (1987)
 Agni Natchathiram (1988)
 Geethanjali (1989)
 Thiruda Thiruda (1993)
 Alaipayuthey (2000)
 O Kadhal Kanmani (2015)
Santosh Sivan
 Thalapathi (1991)
 Roja (1992)
 Iruvar (1997)
 Dil Se.. (1998)
 Raavanan (2010)

Brett Ratner
Dante Spinotti
 The Family Man (2000)
 Red Dragon (2002)
 After the Sunset (2004)
 X-Men: The Last Stand (2006)
 Tower Heist (2011)
 Hercules (2014)

Alain Resnais
Sacha Vierny
 Hiroshima mon amour (1959) – with Michio Takahashi
 Last Year at Marienbad (1961)
 Muriel (1963)
 The War Is Over (1966)
 Stavisky (1974)
 My American Uncle (1980)
 Love Unto Death (1984)

Éric Rohmer
Néstor Almendros
 Six in Paris (segment "Place de l'Etoile") (1965) with Étienne Becker
 La Collectionneuse (1967)
 My Night at Maud's (1969)
 Claire's Knee (1970)
 Love in the Afternoon (1972)
 The Marquise of O (1976)
 Perceval le Gallois (1978)
 Pauline at the Beach (1983)

Mark Rydell
Vilmos Zsigmond
 Cinderella Liberty (1973)
 The Rose (1979)
 The River (1984, Academy Award nomination)
 Intersection (1994)

S
Fred Schepisi
Ian Baker
 The Devil's Playground (1976)
 The Chant of Jimmie Blacksmith (1978)
 Barbarosa (1982)
 Iceman (1984)
 Plenty (1985)
 Roxanne (1987)
 Evil Angels, aka A Cry in the Dark (1988)
 The Russia House (1990)
 Mr. Baseball (1992)
 Six Degrees of Separation (1993)
 I.Q. (1994)
 Fierce Creatures (1997)
 It Runs in the Family (2003)
 Empire Falls (2005, miniseries)
 The Eye of the Storm (2011)
 Words and Pictures (2013)

Paul Schrader
John Bailey
 American Gigolo (1980)
 Cat People (1983)
 Mishima: A Life in Four Chapters (1985)
 Light of Day (1987)
 Forever Mine (1999)

Martin Scorsese

Michael Ballhaus
 After Hours (1985)
 The Color of Money (1986)
 The Last Temptation of Christ (1988)
 Goodfellas (1990)
 The Age of Innocence (1993)
 Gangs of New York (2002, Academy Award nomination)
 The Departed (2006)
Rodrigo Prieto
 The Wolf of Wall Street (2013)
 The Audition (2015 short)
 Silence (2016, Academy Award nomination)
 The Irishman (2019, Academy Award nomination)
 Killers of the Flower Moon (2022)
Robert Richardson
 Casino (1995)
 Bringing Out the Dead (1999)
 The Aviator (2004, Academy Award)
 Shine a Light (2008)
 Shutter Island (2010)
 George Harrison: Living in the Material World (2011)
 Hugo (2011, Academy Award)

Ridley Scott

John Mathieson
 Gladiator (2000, Academy Award nomination)
 Hannibal (2001)
 Matchstick Men (2003)
 Kingdom of Heaven (2005)
 Robin Hood (2010)
Dariusz Wolski
 Prometheus (2012)
 The Counselor (2013)
 Exodus: Gods and Kings (2014)
 The Martian (2015)
 Alien: Covenant (2017)
 All the Money in the World (2017)
 The Last Duel (2021)
 House of Gucci (2021)

Don Siegel
Bruce Surtees
 The Beguiled (1971)
 Dirty Harry (1971)
 The Shootist (1976)
 Escape from Alcatraz (1979)

Bryan Singer
Newton Thomas Sigel
 The Usual Suspects (1995)
 Apt Pupil (1998)
 X-Men (2000)
 X2 (2003)
 Superman Returns (2006)
 Valkyrie (2008)
 Jack the Giant Slayer (2013)
 X-Men: Days of Future Past (2014)
 X-Men: Apocalypse (2016)
 Bohemian Rhapsody (2018)

Douglas Sirk
Russell Metty
 Against All Flags (1952, co-directed by George Sherman)
 Take Me to Town (1953)
 Taza, Son of Cochise (1954)
 Magnificent Obsession (1954)
 Sign of the Pagan (1954)
 All That Heaven Allows (1955)
 There's Always Tomorrow (1956)
 Written on the Wind (1956)
 Battle Hymn (1957)
 A Time to Love and a Time to Die (1958)
 Imitation of Life (1959)

Steven Spielberg

Allen Daviau
Slipstream (1967) 
 Amblin' (1968)
 E.T. the Extra-Terrestrial (1982, Academy Award nomination)
 Twilight Zone: The Movie (segment "Kick the Can") (1983) 
 The Color Purple (1985, Academy Award nomination)
 Empire of the Sun (1987, Academy Award nomination)
Janusz Kamiński
 Schindler's List (1993, Academy Award)
 The Lost World: Jurassic Park (1997)
 Amistad (1997, Academy Award nomination)
 Saving Private Ryan (1998, Academy Award)
 A.I. Artificial Intelligence (2001)
 Minority Report (2002)
 Catch Me If You Can (2002)
 The Terminal (2004)
 War of the Worlds (2005)
 Munich (2005)
 Indiana Jones and the Kingdom of the Crystal Skull (2008)
 War Horse (2011, Academy Award nomination)
 Lincoln (2012, Academy Award nomination)
 Bridge of Spies (2015)
 The BFG (2016)
 The Post (2017)
 Ready Player One (2018)
 West Side Story (2021, Academy Award nomination)
 The Fabelmans (2022)
Vilmos Zsigmond
The Sugarland Express (1974)
Close Encounters of the Third Kind (1977, Academy Award)

Oliver Stone
Robert Richardson
 Salvador (1986)
 Platoon (1986, Academy Award nomination)
 Wall Street (1987)
 Talk Radio (1988)
 Born on the Fourth of July (1989, Academy Award nomination)
 The Doors (1991)
 JFK (1991, Academy Award)
 Heaven & Earth (1993)
 Natural Born Killers (1994)
 Nixon (1995)
 U Turn (1997)

T
Quentin Tarantino
Robert Richardson
 Kill Bill: Volume 1 (2003)
 Kill Bill: Volume 2 (2004)
 Inglourious Basterds (2009, Academy Award nomination)
 Django Unchained (2012, Academy Award nomination)
 The Hateful Eight (2015, Academy Award nomination)
 Once Upon a Time in Hollywood (2019, Academy Award nomination)

François Truffaut

Néstor Almendros
 The Wild Child (1970)
 Bed and Board (1970)
 Two English Girls (1971)
 The Story of Adele H. (1975)
 The Man Who Loved Women (1977)
 The Green Room (1978)
 Love on the Run (1979)
 The Last Metro (1980)
 Confidentially Yours (1983)
Raoul Coutard
 Shoot the Piano Player (1960)
 Jules and Jim (1962)
 Love at Twenty (segment "Antoine et Colette") (1962)
 The Soft Skin (1964)
 The Bride Wore Black (1968)

V
Denis Villeneuve
Roger Deakins
 Prisoners (2013, Academy Award nomination)
 Sicario (2015, Academy Award nomination)
 Blade Runner 2049 (2017, Academy Award)

W
The Wachowskis
Bill Pope
 Bound (1996)
 The Matrix (1999)
 The Matrix Reloaded (2003)
 The Matrix Revolutions (2003)
John Toll
 Cloud Atlas (2012) with Frank Griebe
 Jupiter Ascending (2015)
 The Matrix Resurrections (2021) with Daniele Massaccesi

Wim Wenders
Robby Müller
 Summer in the City (1970)
 The Goalkeeper's Fear of the Penalty (1972)
 The Scarlet Letter (1973)
 Alice in the Cities (1974)
 The Wrong Move (1975)
 Kings of the Road (1976)
 The American Friend (1977)
 Paris, Texas (1984)
 Notebook on Cities and Clothes (1989 documentary) with others
 Until the End of the World (1991)

Wong Kar-wai
Christopher Doyle
 Days of Being Wild (1990)
 Ashes of Time (1994) with Kwan Pun Leung
 Chungking Express (1994) with Andrew Lau
 Fallen Angels (1995)
 wkw/tk/1996@7'55"hk.net (1996, short)
 Happy Together (1997)
 In the Mood for Love (2000) with Mark Lee Ping Bin and Kwan Pun Leung
 Eros (segment "The Hand") (2004)
 2046 (2004) with Kwan Pun Leung and Lai Yiu-fai

Billy Wilder

John F. Seitz
 Five Graves to Cairo (1943, Academy Award nomination)
 Double Indemnity (1944, Academy Award nomination)
 The Lost Weekend (1945, Academy Award nomination)
 Sunset Boulevard (1950, Academy Award nomination)
Joseph LaShelle
 The Apartment (1960, Academy Award nomination)
 Irma la Douce (1963, Academy Award nomination)
 Kiss Me, Stupid (1964, Academy Award nomination)
 The Fortune Cookie (1966, Academy Award nomination)
Charles Lang
 A Foreign Affair (1948, Academy Award nomination)
 Ace in the Hole (1951)
 Sabrina (1954, Academy Award nomination)

Michael Winner
Robert Paynter
 Hannibal Brooks (1969)
 The Games (1970)
 Lawman (1971)
 The Nightcomers (1971)
 Chato's Land (1972)
 The Mechanic (1972)
 Scorpio (1973)
 The Big Sleep (1978)
 Firepower (1979)
 Scream for Help (1984)

John Woo
Jeffrey L. Kimball
 Mission: Impossible 2 (2000)
 The Hire: Hostage (2002)
 Windtalkers (2002)
 Paycheck (2003)

Edgar Wright
Bill Pope
 Scott Pilgrim vs. the World (2010)
 The World's End (2013)
 Baby Driver (2017)

Joe Wright
Seamus McGarvey
 Atonement (2007, Academy Award nomination)
 The Soloist (2009)
 Anna Karenina (2012, Academy Award nomination)
 Pan (2015)
 Cyrano (2021)

William Wyler

Robert Surtees
 Ben-Hur (1959, Academy Award)
 The Collector (1965) with Robert Krasker
 The Liberation of L.B. Jones (1970)
Gregg Toland
 These Three (1936)
 Come and Get It (1936) with Rudolph Mate
 Dead End (1937, Academy Award nomination)
 Wuthering Heights (1939, Academy Award)
 The Westerner (1940)
 The Little Foxes (1941)
 The Best Years of Our Lives (1946)

References

Lists of films
Lists of people by activity
Cinematographer Collaborations

Film director and cinematographer